American Hearts is the first solo album by A.A. Bondy, released in 2007.

Track listing

"Killed Myself When I Was Young" by was featured in an episode of Season 4 of the television series Friday Night Lights and included on the Friday Night Lights Vol. 2 soundtrack

The song "World Without End" was featured in an episode of the 5th season of Friday Night Lights.

Personnel
A.A. Bondy - vocals and guitars

Production
Cover: detail from "History of America" by Ian Felice
Photo and Layout: Clare Felice

References

A. A. Bondy albums
2007 albums
Fat Possum Records albums